John Davis (1854 – August 19, 1903) was a United States Navy sailor and a recipient of the United States military's highest decoration, the Medal of Honor.

Biography

Sometime during that month, while Trenton was at Toulon, France, Coxswain Augustus Ohlensen fell overboard and, because he could not swim, began to sink. Davis and another sailor, Seaman Alexander Haure Turvelin, jumped into the water and rescued Ohlensen from drowning. For this action, both he and Turvelin were awarded the Medal of Honor three and a half years later, on October 18, 1884.

Davis' official Medal of Honor citation reads:
On board the U.S.S. Trenton, Toulon, France, February 1881. Jumping overboard, Davis rescued Augustus Ohlensen, coxswain, from drowning.

Davis left the Navy while still an ordinary seaman. He died at age 48 or 49 and was buried at Hampton National Cemetery in Hampton, Virginia.

See also

List of African-American Medal of Honor recipients
List of Medal of Honor recipients during peacetime

References

1854 births
1903 deaths
Emigrants from British Jamaica to the United States
United States Navy sailors
United States Navy Medal of Honor recipients
Foreign-born Medal of Honor recipients
Non-combat recipients of the Medal of Honor